The Roman Catholic Diocese of Funing/Xiapu  is a diocese located in the municipal region of Ningde (formerly Funing), in the Ecclesiastical province of Fuzhou, centered in the Chinese province of Fujian.

History
 December 27, 1923: Established as Apostolic Vicariate of Funingfu from the Apostolic Vicariate of Northern Fo-kien
 April 11, 1946: Promoted as Diocese of Funing

Leadership
 Bishops of Funing (Roman rite)
 Bishop Thomas Niu Huiqing (Apostolic Administrator 1948–February 28, 1973)
 Archbishop Theodore Labrador Fraile, O.P. (April 11, 1946–May 6, 1980)
 Vicars Apostolic of Funingfu (Roman Rite)
 Bishop Theodore Labrador Fraile, O.P. (later Archbishop) (May 18, 1926–April 11, 1946)

References

 GCatholic.org
 Catholic Hierarchy

Roman Catholic dioceses in China
Christian organizations established in 1923
Roman Catholic dioceses and prelatures established in the 20th century
Christianity in Fujian
Ningde